Alice Claire Fulks (born January 16, 1982) is a voice and stage actress who got her start in voiceover work after she was introduced to ADV Films' ADR director Steven Foster, who cast her as the Countess of Werdenberg in the 2003 anime series Gilgamesh. Following her spectacular performance as the Countess, Alice was later on cast as the lead role of Mylene Hoffman in 009-1, which was praised by ANN reviewer Theron Martin. In 2007, she was one of the hosts of the American Anime Awards presentation ceremony in New York Comic Con.

Currently, Alice resides in Los Angeles, California, where she is the founder and creative director for video production company A*Light Picture.

Credits
009-1 - Mylene Hoffman (009-1)
Air Gear - Natsumi Iriya
Appleseed Ex Machina - Dr. Elizabeth Xander
Best Student Council - Mayumi Minegishi
Ghost Stories - Akane of the Broadcast Room
Ghost Train - Kumi
Gilgamesh - Countess Werdenberg
Innocent Venus - Hijin
Le Chevalier D'Eon - Empress Elizaveta of Russia
Pumpkin Scissors - Hannah
Red Garden - Isabelle Girardot
Samurai Gun - Lady of the Evening, Running Prostitute

References

External links
2007 ActiveAnime.com interview

1982 births
American voice actresses
Living people
Actresses from Houston
21st-century American women